
Year 386 BC was a year of the pre-Julian Roman calendar. At the time, it was known as the Year of the Tribunate of Camillus, Cornelius, Fidenas, Cincinnatus, Pulvillus and Poplicola (or, less frequently, year 368 Ab urbe condita). The denomination 386 BC for this year has been used since the early medieval period, when the Anno Domini calendar era became the prevalent method in Europe for naming years.

Events 
 By place 

 Persian Empire 
 Freed from Spartan attacks by the King's Peace of the previous year, Persia turns to quieting Cyprus and Egypt. Owing to the skill of King Evagoras of Cyprus and of Egypt's Greek mercenary general Chabrias, these wars drag on for the rest of the decade.

 Sicily 
 Dionysius I of Syracuse extends the influence and trade of Syracuse to the Adriatic, establishing colonies at Adria, Ancona and Issa.

 China 
 The Chinese city of Handan is founded by the State of Zhao.

Births 
 Rhydondis, Greek mercenary (approximate date)

Deaths 
 Aristophanes, Greek playwright (b. c. 456 BC)

References